The year 2017 in Japanese music.

Events
68th NHK Kōhaku Uta Gassen

Number-ones
Oricon number-one albums
Oricon number-one singles
Hot 100 number-one singles

Awards
59th Japan Record Awards
2017 MTV Video Music Awards Japan

Albums released

January

February

March

April

May

June

August

September

October

November

December

Debuting

Debuting groups

=LOVE
100%
22/7
Blackpink
Brats
Cellchrome
Chō Tokimeki Sendenbu
CY8ER
Cynhn
Dimlim
Exo-CBX
Faky
Leetspeak Monsters
Lovebites
Mellow Mellow
Migma Shelter
Monsta X
NCT 127
NGT48
Novelbright
Pentagon
Pink Babies
Pink Cres.
Polkadot Stingray
Qyoto
SF9
The Rampage from Exile Tribe
Roselia
SudannaYuzuYully
TRCNG
Twice
Up10tion
Winner
Yorushika

Debuting soloists
 Adieu
 Asca
 Beverly
 Hiroomi Tosaka
 Junna
 Keina Suda
 Masaki Suda
 Nao Tōyama
 Rena Nōnen
 Sayuri
 Shiina Natsukawa
 Shuta Sueyoshi
 Sōma Saitō
 Taecyeon
 Tao Tsuchiya

Artists resuming activities
 Chemistry
 Megumi Nakajima
 Makidai
 Gesu no Kiwami Otome
 Indigo la End
 Aoi Yūki

Artists on hiatus
 Ikimono-gakari
 Tsubaki
 YuiKaori
 Ami Wajima
 Tsuki Amano
 Pour Lui
 Tackey & Tsubasa
 Sphere
 Vamps
 Flumpool
 Cyntia
 Mejibray

Retiring artists
 Nanami Hashimoto
 Sayaka Shionoya
 Momoko Tsugunaga
 Ray
 Himeka Nakamoto
 Mai Endo
 Haruka Shimada
 Shuuka Fujii

Disbanding artists
 Doll Elements
 Especia
 Prizmmy
 Rev. from DVL
 White Ash
 C-ute
 Mimi Meme Mimi
 Plenty
 Reol
 Megamasso
 Hilcrhyme
 Musubizm
 Cibo Matto
 Sug
 High4
 Wonder Girls

Deaths
 February 8 – Rina Matsuno, 18, idol singer and model, heart arrhythmia
 February 25 – Toshio Nakanishi, 61, musician and producer, esophageal cancer
 March 1 – Hiroshi Kamayatsu, 78, singer and guitarist, pancreatic cancer
 April 12 – Peggy Hayama, 83, singer, pneumonia
 July 8 – Seiji Yokoyama, 82, composer, pneumonia
 December 2 – Norihiko Hashida, 72, folk singer-songwriter, parkinson's disease

See also
 2017 in Japan
 2017 in Japanese television
 List of Japanese films of 2017

References